Benjamin Cook or Cooke may refer to:

 Benjamin Cook (journalist) (born 1982), English journalist and Doctor Who author
 Benjamin Cook (scientist), American climate scientist
 Benjamin S. Cook, American nanotechnology scientist
 Benjamin Cooke (1734–1793), English composer, or his father an English publisher
 Ben Cook (actor) (born 1997), American actor, singer, and dancer
 Ben Cook (coach) (born 1963), American strength coach and author
 Ben Cook (speedway rider) (born 1997), Australian speedway rider
 Ben Cooke (born 1974), British stuntman